The 1986-87 NBA season was the Bucks' 19th season in the NBA. For the first time since 1978-79, the Bucks did not win their division.

During the season, coach and general manager Don Nelson started to experience a rift in friendship with Bucks owner Herb Kohl due to personal disagreements with Kohl on how to run the team. During Game 4 of the 1987 Eastern Conference Semifinals between the Bucks and the Boston Celtics, Nelson controversially announced to the local and national sports media that he did not expect to return to the Bucks after the season was over due to said rift with Kohl. Nelson would in fact resign after the Bucks lost the series to Boston in seven games, coming back from being down 3-1 in the series only to lose the seventh and deciding game in Boston Garden. After 11 seasons coaching and managing the Bucks, Nelson took the year off only to return in the 1988-89 season as coach and manager of the Golden State Warriors. The Bucks hired Nelson's assistant coach, Del Harris, to take over the team for the 1987-88 season.

Draft picks

Roster

Regular season

Season standings

z - clinched division title
y - clinched division title
x - clinched playoff spot

Record vs. opponents

Game log

|-style="background:#bbffbb;"
| 1 || October 31, 1986 || @ Detroit
| W 120–104
|
|
|
| Pontiac Silverdome
| 1-0

|-style="background:#bbffbb;"
| 2 || November 1, 1986 || Boston
| W 111–105
|
|
|
| MECCA Arena
| 2–0

Playoffs

|- align="center" bgcolor="#ccffcc"
| 1
| April 24
| Philadelphia
| W 107–104
| Terry Cummings (21)
| Jack Sikma (11)
| Paul Pressey (10)
| MECCA Arena11,052
| 1–0
|- align="center" bgcolor="#ffcccc"
| 2
| April 26
| Philadelphia
| L 122–125 (OT)
| Ricky Pierce (24)
| Randy Breuer (9)
| Paul Pressey (9)
| MECCA Arena11,052
| 1–1
|- align="center" bgcolor="#ccffcc"
| 3
| April 29
| @ Philadelphia
| W 121–120
| Terry Cummings (26)
| Jack Sikma (12)
| John Lucas (9)
| Spectrum14,361
| 2–1
|- align="center" bgcolor="#ffcccc"
| 4
| May 1
| @ Philadelphia
| L 118–124
| Terry Cummings (29)
| Jack Sikma (13)
| John Lucas (10)
| Spectrum15,464
| 2–2
|- align="center" bgcolor="#ccffcc"
| 5
| May 3
| Philadelphia
| W 102–89
| Jack Sikma (18)
| Jack Sikma (21)
| Paul Pressey (9)
| MECCA Arena11,052
| 3–2
|-

|- align="center" bgcolor="#ffcccc"
| 1
| May 5
| @ Boston
| L 98–111
| Terry Cummings (28)
| Terry Cummings (12)
| Paul Pressey (8)
| Boston Garden14,890
| 0–1
|- align="center" bgcolor="#ffcccc"
| 2
| May 6
| @ Boston
| L 124–126
| Terry Cummings (28)
| Jack Sikma (14)
| Paul Pressey (6)
| Boston Garden14,890
| 0–2
|- align="center" bgcolor="#ccffcc"
| 3
| May 8
| Boston
| W 126–121 (OT)
| John Lucas (30)
| Terry Cummings (12)
| Paul Pressey (7)
| MECCA Arena11,052
| 1–2
|- align="center" bgcolor="#ffcccc"
| 4
| May 10
| Boston
| L 137–138 (2OT)
| Terry Cummings (31)
| Terry Cummings (11)
| Paul Pressey (11)
| MECCA Arena11,052
| 1–3
|- align="center" bgcolor="#ccffcc"
| 5
| May 13
| @ Boston
| W 129–124
| Sidney Moncrief (33)
| Sikma, Cummings (9)
| Paul Pressey (10)
| Boston Garden14,890
| 2–3
|- align="center" bgcolor="#ccffcc"
| 6
| May 15
| Boston
| W 121–111
| Sidney Moncrief (34)
| Terry Cummings (11)
| Paul Pressey (11)
| MECCA Arena11,052
| 3–3
|- align="center" bgcolor="#ffcccc"
| 7
| May 17
| @ Boston
| L 113–119
| Paul Pressey (28)
| Jack Sikma (10)
| Paul Pressey (8)
| Boston Garden14,890
| 3–4
|-

Player statistics
Source:

Season

Playoffs

Awards and records
 Ricky Pierce, NBA Sixth Man of the Year Award
 Paul Pressey, NBA All-Defensive Second Team

Transactions

Trades

References

See also
 1986-87 NBA season

Milwaukee Bucks seasons
Milwaukee
Milwaukee Bucks
Milwaukee Bucks